M. Rajendran served as Vice-Chancellor of Tamil University, Thanjavur, in Tamil Nadu, India. He is a Tamil Scholar, Writer and Publisher of Kanaiyazhi literary magazine in Tamil., He was the coordinator of academic committee, World Classical Tamil Conference 2010. He chaired the High Level Committee to amend the Tamil Nadu Public Library Act and Tamil Nadu Public Library Rules, which was constituted by the Government of Tamil Nadu in January 2022. Kalingar Mu. Karunanidhi Classic Tamil Award, Muthamilkavalar Ki.Aa.Be. Vishwanatham Award has been given to him.

Birth 
M. Rajendran was born as a first son to classical musician Mahadevan and Gnanammal on 3 March 3, 1951, at `'Eda Annavasal'', the hamlet of Itdangankottai Keelaiyur alais Eda Keelaiyur in Thiruvarur district of Tamil Nadu state in India; but, his native village is Kudavasal,

Education
Since the father of Rajendran died when Rajendran was one year old, he completed his schooling with the support of his maternal uncle. Mr. Su. Natesan.

 Studied primary education (grades 1–5) at the Panchayat Union Primary School, Eda Annavasal.
 Studied upper primary education (classes 6–8) and secondary education (classes 9-11) at Government High School, Eda Melaiyur.
 Studied at Rajah's College of Tamil Studies and Music, Thiruvaiyaru and obtained Pulavar (Tamil Scholar) degree, while Mr. Gopaliyar was his teacher and principal.  
 Studied M.A. (Tamil) at Pachaiyappa’s College, Chennai. 
 Awarded Master of Philosophy by Madras University in the year of 1979 against his research on "Ra.See.'s Novels – A Study" under the guidance of Professor Dr. N. Jeyaprakasam at Pachaiyappa’s College in Chennai.
 Awarded Doctor of Philosophy in 1984, for his research on First Surveyor General of India Colin Mackenzie's (1754–1821) collection of manuscripts as "Mackenzie's Tamil Manuscripts'under the guidance of Professor Dr. N. Sanjeevi at Department of Tamil, Madras University.

Profession
Rajendran served in Government of Tamil Nadu as

Vice-Chancellor, Tamil University, Thanjavur, between 2008 June 19 and 2011 June 18,
 Coordinator of the academic committee, World Classical Tamil Conference between 2009 and 2010
Director (Honorary), International School of Dravidian Linguistics, Trivandrum between 2009 and 2011 
Director (in charge), International Institute of Tamil Studies, between 2006 June and 2008 June
Director (in charge), Tamil Etymological Dictionary Project during 2008 
Special Officer (in charge), Kural Peedam – Tamil Nadu between 2001 and 2003
Director, Department of Tamil Development between 1999 April 1 and 2008 June 17
Director, Department of Translation between 1996 and 1999
Deputy Director, Department of Translation between 1993 and 1996
Special Officer for Research, International Institute of Tamil Studies  – Two Years
 Lecturer and Special Research Fellow, Tamil University, Thanjavur between 1986 and 1989
 Assistant Professor of Tamil, Pachaiyappa's College (Evening), Chennai during 1980–81
 Tami Pandit (Tamil Scholar), Government Oriental Manuscripts Library, Chennai between 1974 and 1986.

Member of Committees
Rajendran was appointed by the Government of Tamil Nadu to the following expert committees:

 Member, Madurai Kamaraj University vice-chancellor search committee, 
 Member, Tamil Nadu Open University Vice Chancellor Search Committee 2022
 Member, Committee for Dravida Kalanchiam
 Chairman, Tamil Nadu Public Library Act and Rules Amendment – High Level Committee 2022 from 31-01-2022 to 30-07-2022

Editor
Dr. M. Rajendran edited the following publications:
 Translation of Sangam Literature in Hindi
 Proceedings of the World Classical Tamil Conference, 2010 (10 Volunres)
 Journal of Tamil Studies (4 volumes from June 2006 to December 2007), published by International Institute of Tamil Studies, Chennai

Awards 
The Government of Tamil Nadu has given him the following awards to recognize his work in Tamil:

 Kalaingar Mu. Karunanidhi Classical Tamil Award 2020; Central Institute of Classical Tamil Studies, Chennai.
 K. A. P. Vishwanatham Award 2021; Department of Tamil Development, Government of Tamil Nadu, Chennai

Author of 
Dr. M. Rajendran authors the following books

Translations
His works have been translated into English and published in the following books:
 Memory Mist; 2016 Dec 23; Pustaka Digital Media
 TRIO Modern Tamil Stories; 2002; Writer's Workshop, Calcutta.

Published by

Published Journals
 Publisher, Kaniyazhi, since 1995
 Editor, Journal of Tamil studies, 2006–2008, International Institute of Tamil Studies, Chennai.

Family
M. Rajendran's siblings are two girls. He is married to Maithili. They have two daughters Theral and Ezhil and three grandchildren Meghana, Kevin and Dillana.

References

External links 
Wikipedia-Tamil page on M Rajendran
Rajendran M; Power unto the language; The Hindu; 2010-June-23 
  சாதி, மதம், வட்டாரத்தைக் கடந்து தமிழை பொது மொழியாக்க வேண்டும்  – ம. இராசேந்திரன் 25 – ஏப்ரல் 2010 கீற்று மின்னிதழில் வெளிவந்த நேர்காணல் 

1951 births
Tamil writers
Writers from Tamil Nadu
People from Thiruvarur
Living people
Scholars from Tamil Nadu
Indian Tamil academics
Heads of universities and colleges in India
20th-century Indian novelists
20th-century Indian short story writers
20th-century Indian essayists
Recipients of the Sahitya Akademi Award in Tamil